Titus Desticius Juba was a Roman governor of Britain between 253 and 258. Anthony Birley writes that Desticius Juba "is the latest known instance of a consular governor of Upper Britain, and indeed of any consular governor with senatorial legates and legions under him."

Desticius Juba likely had his origins at Concordia in northern Italy, where numerous inscriptions have been found attesting to "Desticii, with the praenomen Titus, and several with the cognomen Juba". He had served in Rome as suffect consul and some time later was posted to Britannia Superior. The barracks at Caerleon were refurbished under his governorship between the years 253 and 255.

References

External links
Roman-Britain.org entry

Roman governors of Britain
3rd-century Romans
Suffect consuls of Imperial Rome
Place of birth unknown
Place of death unknown